Guardian Industries is a privately held industrial manufacturer of glass, automotive and building products based in Auburn Hills, Michigan.
The company manufactures float glass, fabricated glass products, fiberglass insulation and building materials for commercial, residential and automotive applications.
The company employs more than 18,000 people and has present activities in North and South America, Europe, Asia, Africa and the Middle East.

History
Guardian Industries was founded in 1932 as Guardian Glass Company. The company was originally established as a small windshield fabricator. In 1957, the same year Guardian filed for Chapter 11 bankruptcy, William Davidson became president of Guardian, 10 years after he graduated from the University of Michigan in 1957. After three years in 1960, Guardian came out of bankruptcy. In 1968, the company officially changed its name to Guardian Industries Corp. and under William Davidson's leadership; they went public with the initial trade valued at $17 a share. The following year Guardian began trading on the American Stock Exchange.

In 1970, Guardian started producing flat glass with the newly invented float glass process. They opened their first production line in Carleton, Michigan and today the company counts 28 float glass lines and 13 glass fabrication plants around the world. In 1973, it began trading on the New York Stock Exchange.
From on 1980, Guardian started to diversify its activities and they started the production of fiberglass insulation. The European market entry took place in 1981, when the company opened their production line in Bascharage, Luxembourg. Further plants came up in Germany, Spain, England, Hungary and Poland.
The company went back to a privately held company in 1985, after 17 years as a public company.

In the 1990s, Guardian could note down an upswing both in the sectors construction materials and automotive products due to several takeovers and acquisitions: Automotive Moulding Company Warren, Michigan; Lab. Radio from Valencia, Spain; Builder Marts of America (BMA) and Cameron Ashley Building Products (which is now the Guardian Building Products Distribution) in 2000.
In 1995, corporate headquarters moved from Novi to their present location in Auburn Hills, Michigan.

The takeover of Siegel-Robert Automotive in 2008, led to the formation of SRG Global.

On February 1, 2017, Koch Industries completed its acquisition of Guardian Industries.

References

External links

Glassmaking companies of the United States
Manufacturing companies based in Michigan
Companies based in Oakland County, Michigan
Auburn Hills, Michigan
Koch Industries
American brands
Manufacturing companies established in 1932
1932 establishments in Michigan
Companies that have filed for Chapter 11 bankruptcy
2017 mergers and acquisitions